The Ethiopia Fed Cup team represents Ethiopia in Fed Cup tennis competition and are governed by the Ethiopian Tennis Federation.  They have not competed since 1998.

History
Ethiopia competed in its first Fed Cup in 1996, and also competed in 1997 and 1998.  They have lost all 13 of their ties to date.

See also
Fed Cup
Ethiopia Davis Cup team

External links

Billie Jean King Cup teams
Fed Cup
Fed Cup